Salmostoma sladoni is a species of ray-finned fish in the genus Salmostoma.

References

 

sladoni
Fish described in 1870
Taxobox binomials not recognized by IUCN